The Solo Wings Aquilla is a South African ultralight trike designed and produced by Solo Wings of Gillitts, KwaZulu-Natal. The aircraft was also sold in the United States by Bateleur Sky Sports of Palm Coast, Florida in the early 2000s, under their own name.

Design and development
It features a cable-braced hang glider-style high-wing, weight-shift controls, a two-seats-in-tandem open cockpit, tricycle landing gear and a single engine in pusher configuration.

The aircraft is made from tubing, with its wing covered in Dacron sailcloth. Its  span wing is supported by a single tube-type kingpost and uses an "A" frame control bar. The landing gear includes suspension on all three wheels and a steerable nose wheel. The standard engine supplied is the Rotax 582  twin cylinder, two-stroke, liquid-cooled aircraft engine.

Specifications (2000 model Bateleur Aquilla)

References

External links

1990s South African ultralight aircraft
Single-engined pusher aircraft
Ultralight trikes
Solo Wings aircraft